Nikola Frljužec (born 29 July 1989 in Ptuj) is a Croatian football player currently playing for Austrian amateur side Pitten.

Club career
He has previously played for NK Zagreb, NK Slaven Belupo, NK Hrvatski Dragovoljac and NK Varazdin, before moving to Austria where he played for several clubs at different levels.

Honours

Club
SV Lafnitz
Austrian Regionalliga Central (1) 2017-18

References

External links
 

1989 births
Living people
People from Ptuj
Association football forwards
Croatian footballers
NK Varaždin players
NK Hrvatski Dragovoljac players
NK Slaven Belupo players
SV Lafnitz players
1. Simmeringer SC players
Croatian Football League players
Austrian Regionalliga players
2. Liga (Austria) players
Austrian 2. Landesliga players
Croatian expatriate footballers
Expatriate footballers in Austria
Croatian expatriate sportspeople in Austria